The 2021–22 Melbourne Boomers season is the 39th season for the franchise in the Women's National Basketball League (WNBL).

Roster

Standings

Results

Regular season

Finals

Semi-finals

Grand Final

References

External links
Melbourne Boomers Official website

2021–22 WNBL season
WNBL seasons by team
Basketball,Melbourne Boomers
2021 in basketball
2021 in women's basketball
2021–22 in Australian basketball